Charles Ormsby Wiley (30 Jul 1839; 11 Mar 1915)  was an Anglican priest in Ireland in the late nineteenth and early 20th centuries.

Wiley was born in Dublin and educated at Trinity College, Dublin and ordained in 1863. After a curacies in Trim and Tullow  he was Rector of Crossmolina from 1872. He was Archdeacon of Killala from 1903 to 1904; and   Dean of Killala from 1908 until his death.

Notes

1839 births
Christian clergy from Dublin (city)
Alumni of Trinity College Dublin
19th-century Irish Anglican priests
20th-century Irish Anglican priests
1915 deaths
Archdeacons of Killala
Deans of Killala